Phenomics is the systematic study of traits that make up a phenotype, and was coined by UC Berkeley and LBNL scientist Steven A. Garan. As such, it is a transdisciplinary area of research that involves biology, data sciences, engineering and other fields. Phenomics is concerned with the measurement of the phenotype where a phenome is a set of traits (physical and biochemical traits) that can be produced by a given organism over the course of development and in response to genetic mutation and environmental influences. The relationship between phenotype and genotype enables researchers to understand and study pleiotropy. Phenomics concepts are used in functional genomics, pharmaceutical research, metabolic engineering, agricultural research, and increasingly in phylogenetics.

Technical challenges involve improving, both qualitatively and quantitatively, the capacity to measure phenomes.

Applications

Plant sciences 
In plant sciences, phenomics research occurs in both field and controlled environments. Field phenomics encompasses the measurement of phenotypes that occur in both cultivated and natural conditions, whereas controlled environment phenomics research involves the use of glass houses, growth chambers, and other systems where growth conditions can be manipulated. The University of Arizona's Field Scanner in Maricopa, Arizona is a platform developed to measure field phenotypes, and the Maize Genomes to Fields Initiative is an example of a large-scale, distributed field phenomics project across many environments and years. Controlled environment systems include the Enviratron at Iowa State University, the Plant Cultivation Hall under construction at IPK, and platforms at the Donald Danforth Plant Science Center, the University of Nebraska-Lincoln, and elsewhere.

Pharmaceutical sciences 
Phenomics profiling of cells is emerging as a powerful technology to study cellular responses to genetic or chemical perturbations. High content-microscopy, in combination with fluorescent probes, can be used for capturing rich phenotypic information. Phenomics analysis of cells is used, among others, for the study of functional genomics, disease phenotyping, compound target identification, mechanism of action (MoA) prediction and toxicity studies.

Standards, methods, tools, and instrumentation 
A Minimal Information About a Plant Phenotyping Experiment (MIAPPE) standard is available and in use among many researchers collecting and organizing plant phenomics data. A diverse set of computer vision methods exist to analyze 2D and 3D imaging data of plants. These methods are available to the community in various implementations, ranging from end-user ready cyber-platforms in the cloud such as DIRT and PlantIt to programming frameworks for software developers such as PlantCV. Many research groups are focused on developing systems using the Breeding API, a Standardized RESTful Web Service API Specification for communicating Plant Breeding Data.

The Australian Plant Phenomics Facility (APPF), an initiative of the Australian government, has developed a number of new instruments for comprehensive and fast measurements of phenotypes in both the lab and the field.

Research coordination and communities 
The International Plant Phenotyping Network (IPPN) is an organization that seeks to enable exchange of knowledge, information, and expertise across many disciplines involved in plant phenomics by providing a network linking members, platform operators, users, research groups, developers, and policy makers. Regional partners include, the European Plant Phenotyping Network (EPPN), the North American Plant Phenotyping Network (NAPPN), and others.

The European research infrastructure for plant phenotyping, EMPHASIS, enables researchers to use facilities, services and resources for multi-scale plant phenotyping across Europe. EMPHASIS aims to promote future food security and agricultural business in a changing climate by enabling scientists to better understand plant performance and translate this knowledge into application.

See also 
 PhenomicDB, a database combining phenotypic and genetic data from several species
 Phenotype microarray
 Human Phenotype Ontology,  a formal ontology of human phenotypes

References

Further reading 

 

 
Branches of biology
Omics